, also known as Naoko, is a 1998 novel by Keigo Higashino.

Himitsu may also refer to:

 Himitsu (film), 1999 Japanese film based on the novel directed by Yōjirō Takita

Music 
 Himitsu (Yui Horie album), a 2012 studio album
 "Himitsu", a 2004 song by Shikao Suga
 "Himitsu", a 2005 song by Azumi Uehara
 "Himitsu", a 2005 Kazunari Ninomiya solo song on One (Arashi album)
 "Himitsu", a 2005 song by Hitomi Shimatani on the album Crossover
 "Himitsu" or "A Secret", a 2006 Tokyo Jihen song on the album Adult
 Himitsu, a 2008 album by singer aiko
 "Himitsu", a 2008 Kumi Koda song on the album Kingdom
 Bonnie Pink song "himitsu", on 2009 album One (Bonnie Pink album)
 "Himitsu", a 2011 song by Maaya Sakamoto on the album You Can't Catch Me
 "Himitsu" or "Secret", a 2011 song by singer Yuki

Other uses 
 Himitsu – Top Secret, a Japanese manga series written and illustrated by Reiko Shimizu

See also
 Himitsu no Hanazono or The Secret Garden, 2007 Japanese television series
 Himitsu no hanazono (film) or My Secret Cache, 1997 Japanese film
 Himitsu Sentai Gorenger, Japanese television series from 1975 to 1977
 The Secret (2007 film), a French film based on Keigo Higashino's 1998 novel Himitsu
 Secret (disambiguation)